Hereditary hyperbilirubinemia refers to the condition where levels of bilirubin are elevated, for reasons that can be attributed to a metabolic disorder.

An example is Crigler–Najjar syndrome.

Symptoms and signs
UGT1A1 gene mutations causes the condition. As a result, there can be reduced functionality of the bilirubin-UGT enzyme. Eventually it causes unconjugated hyperbilirubinemia and jaundice as substance accumulates in the body due to the reduced ability of the enzyme.

Diagnosis

Management

References

Further reading

External links 

Syndromes
Heme metabolism disorders
Hepatology